Liviu Ionuț Mihai (born 12 March 1988) is a Romanian professional footballer who plays as a midfielder.

Honours
Petrolul Ploiești
Liga II: 2010–11

CSMS Iași
Liga II: 2013–14

Chindia Târgoviște
Liga II: 2018–19

References

External links
 
 

1988 births
Living people
Sportspeople from Constanța
Romanian footballers
Association football defenders
Liga I players
Liga II players
Liga III players
FCV Farul Constanța players
FC Astra Giurgiu players
FC Petrolul Ploiești players
AFC Unirea Slobozia players
FC Politehnica Iași (2010) players
AFC Chindia Târgoviște players
AFC Turris-Oltul Turnu Măgurele players
FC Unirea Constanța players
FC Metaloglobus București players